Salma is a village in northwestern Syria, administratively part of the Latakia Governorate, located northeast of Latakia. Nearby localities include Mashqita and Ayn al-Bayda to the west, al-Haffah to the southwest, Aramo and Slinfah 12 km to the south, and Kinsabba to the north. According to the Syria Central Bureau of Statistics, Salma had a population of 2,131 in the 2004 census. Its inhabitants and those of the Jabal al-Akrad area are predominantly Sunni Muslims, although about 80% of the Latakia District's residents are Alawites.

Salma is well known for its dry climate and its plentiful clean water. It is situated about 800 meters above sea level. Prior to the Baathist takeover of Syria in the 1960s, Salma was one of the few places in the coastal mountain region to be electrified and connected to a grid.

Syrian civil war

During the Syrian civil war, as of late July 2012 the FSA controlled the town, whose population has mostly left (part to Latakia city and part to Turkey). The FSA said that they were able to hold on to Salma thanks to its mountainous nature and the fact that it is surrounded by Sunni villages. It was on the front line of fighting in Latakia Governorate between rebels and government forces for a lengthy period of time. In November 2013, reporter Jonathan Steele claimed that the town was the Latakia governorate headquarters of both al-Nusra Front and the Islamic State of Iraq and the Levant.

On 9 November 2015, it was reported that for over a month the Syrian Armed Forces had conducted several small military operations inside the Latakia Governorate in order to prepare for a much larger battle that was expected to take place in the rebel stronghold of Salma. By the end of November, the capture of Kafr Dulbeh and Katf Al-Ghaddar had brought the Syrian Armed Forces forces to the gates of Salma. On 12 January 2016, the Syrian army with allies recaptured the town of Salma and the nearby village of Tirtyah.  Rebels said the town was subjected to intense Russian airstrikes and that most remaining residents had fled towards the Turkish border.

References

Bibliography

Populated places in al-Haffah District